The 1986 Milan Indoor (also known as the 1986 Fila Trophy for sponsorship reasons) was a men's tennis tournament played on indoor carpet courts. The event was part of the 1986 Nabisco Grand Prix. It was the ninth edition of the tournament and was played at the PalaLido in Milan, Italy from 10 March until 16 March 1986. First-seeded Ivan Lendl won the singles title, his second at the event after 1983, and earned $80,000 first-prize money.

Finals

Singles

 Ivan Lendl defeated  Joakim Nyström 6–2, 6–2, 6–4
 It was Lendl's 3rd singles title of the year and the 56th of his career.

Doubles
 Colin Dowdeswell /  Christo Steyn defeated  Brian Levine /  Laurie Warder 6–3, 4–6, 6–1

References

External links
 ITF tournament edition details

Milan
Milan Indoor
Milan Indoor
Milan Indoor